Simon Jonathan Collins (born 16 December 1973) is an English former professional footballer, born in Pontefract, Yorkshire, who made 200 appearances in the Football League playing as a defender for Huddersfield Town, Plymouth Argyle, Macclesfield Town and Shrewsbury Town. He was manager of Bradford Park Avenue, having previously been in charge at Ossett Town and Stocksbridge Park Steels.

Career
Collins started his career as a trainee at Huddersfield Town, spending time on loan to Halifax Town before joining Plymouth Argyle in 1997. He appeared in the famous Jimmy Glass game, in which Carlisle United's goalkeeper scored in the 94th minute to save his club from relegation from the Football League. After leaving Argyle in 1999 he played for Macclesfield Town and Shrewsbury Town in the league, and then for non-league clubs Frickley Athletic, Belper Town, Bradford Park Avenue, Grantham Town, Ossett Town, and Stocksbridge Park Steels.

He then went into coaching, and managed Ossett Town from 2007 to 2009 before taking over as manager of Stocksbridge Park Steels in September 2009. Collins left Stocksbridge in March 2010, just six months after joining, before being appointed new Bradford Park Avenue manager in May 2010, following the end of the 2009–10 season.

His younger brother Sam also became a professional footballer; the brothers played alongside each other for Huddersfield Town.

References

External links
 
 
 Simon Collins at Footballdatabase

1973 births
Living people
Sportspeople from Pontefract
English footballers
Association football defenders
Huddersfield Town A.F.C. players
Halifax Town A.F.C. players
Plymouth Argyle F.C. players
Macclesfield Town F.C. players
Shrewsbury Town F.C. players
Frickley Athletic F.C. players
Belper Town F.C. players
Bradford (Park Avenue) A.F.C. players
Grantham Town F.C. players
Ossett Town F.C. players
Stocksbridge Park Steels F.C. players
English Football League players
English football managers
Stocksbridge Park Steels F.C. managers
Bradford (Park Avenue) A.F.C. managers
Ossett Town F.C. managers